Spilarctia philippina is a moth in the family Erebidae. It was described by Vladimir Viktorovitch Dubatolov and Yasunori Kishida in 2006. It is found in the Philippines.

Subspecies
Spilarctia philippina philippina (Philippines: Negros)
Spilarctia philippina mindanaoica Dubatolov & Kishida, 2006 (Philippines: Mindanao, Leyte, Samar)

References

P
Endemic fauna of the Philippines
Moths of the Philippines
Moths described in 2006